Ailoche is a comune (municipality) in the Province of Biella in the Italian region Piedmont, located about  northeast of Turin and about  northwest of Biella.

Ailoche borders the following municipalities: Caprile, Coggiola, Crevacuore, Guardabosone, Postua. Sights include  the Santuario della Brugarola.

References

 
Articles which contain graphical timelines